Nakia Antwan Jenkins (born June 29, 1975) is a former professional American football player and coach.

High school
Nakia attended Glades Central High School in Belle Glade, Florida. He was a teammate of Fred Taylor and Reidel Anthony. He played for the school band his freshman and sophomore year.

College career
He was named first-team All-Foothill Conference during the 1994 and 1995 season at Chaffey Junior College. He transferred to Utah State where he played with quarterback Matthew Sauk under head coach John L. Smith.

Professional career
Jenkins went undrafted in the 1998 NFL Draft. He was signed as an undrafted free agent by the New York Jets. He was waived during training camp. In 1999 Nakia signed with the Jacksonville Jaguars, he was again released during training camp. In 2000, Jenkins was drafted by the Las Vegas Outlaws of the defunct XFL.In 2002, Jenkins was signed by the Toronto Phantoms of the Arena Football League. In 2004, he played for the Grand Rapids Rampage. In 2007, Jenkins was named head coach of Miami Vice Squad of the National Indoor Football League.

References

External links
http://www.all-xfl.com/lasvegasoutlaws/team/roster/nakiajenkins.htm
http://jacksonville.com/tu-online/stories/090199/jag_1c1cuts.html

Living people
1975 births
People from Alta Loma, Rancho Cucamonga, California
African-American players of American football
Players of American football from California
Players of American football from Florida
Sportspeople from San Bernardino County, California
Utah State Aggies football players
New York Jets players
Jacksonville Jaguars players
Las Vegas Outlaws (XFL) players
Toronto Phantoms players
Grand Rapids Rampage players
21st-century African-American sportspeople
20th-century African-American sportspeople